The Tour de Helsinki is an annual cyclosportive in the metropolitan area of Helsinki, the capital of Finland. It takes place on the first Sunday in September.

Start and finish are at the Helsinki Velodrome, originally built for the 1952 Summer Olympics. The distance of the race, leading through the southern parts of the Uusimaa region, is 140 km.

Every year, the Tour de Helsinki features some cycling professionals; e.g. Kjell Carlström, Kimmo Kananen and Jussi Veikkanen have been participating in the event. In 2010 and 2011, also Minister Alexander Stubb was among the participants.

Number of participants
The event was first organized in 2007, by initiative of five cycling clubs from the capital region (Prologi, CCH, IK-32, Vantaan Pyöräilijät and Helsingin Polkupyöräilijät). The first event started with over 400 participants and one year later, in 2008, it had already grown to over 950 cyclists.

In 2011, almost 2200 people participated in the event.

Notes

External links
http://www.tourdehelsinki.fi/index.php?id=27 Official event site.

Road bicycle races
Cyclosportives
Recurring sporting events established in 2007
2007 establishments in Finland